The Ministry of Social Development (MSD) (Māori: Te Manatū Whakahiato Ora) is the public service department of New Zealand charged with advising the government on social policy, and providing social services.

MSD is the largest public service department employing public servants in over 200 locations around New Zealand.  It works closely with other public service departments and agencies, non-government organisations, advisory and industry groups, and communities and iwi. MSD delivers its programmes and services through a number of business groups and agencies.

Some of the functions of the ministry were historically performed by the Social Security Department, the Department of Social Welfare, and the Department of Work and Income (WINZ).

Organisational history 
Timeline of major events and developments in the Ministry of Social Development's history.

1904 - Old Age Pensions Department established.

1909-1912  - Pensions administered as a division of the Post and Telegraph Department.

1913  - Pensions Department established.

1 April 1939 - Social Security Department under the control of Social Security Commission was established by the Social Security Act, 1938. It replaced the former Pensions Department and absorbed the major portion of the Employment Division of the Department of Labour.

1 April 1972 - Department of Social Welfare formed from the amalgamation of the Social Security Department and the Child Welfare Division of the Department of Education.

1 May 1992 - Major restructuring of the Department of Social Welfare into business units:

 New Zealand Income Support Service
 New Zealand Children and Young Persons Service
 New Zealand Community Funding Agency
 Social Policy Agency
 Corporate Office

December 1998 - Housing policy function of the Ministry of Housing transferred to the Social Policy Agency of the Department of Social Welfare.

1 October 1998 - Department of Work and Income (branded as Work and Income New Zealand or WINZ) established with the merger of Income Support with the New Zealand Employment Service, Community Employment Group and Local Employment Co-ordination.

1 October 1999 - Ministry of Social Policy established, with the amalgamation of the Social Policy Agency and Corporate Office functions of the former Department of Social Welfare and the addition of the new Purchasing and Monitoring Group.

1 October 1999 - Department of Child, Youth and Family Services (CYFS) established. Was previously Children, Young Persons and their Families Agency (CYPFA).

1 July 2001 - Housing Policy function of the Ministry of Social Policy moves to Housing New Zealand Corporation.

1 October 2001 - Ministry of Social Development established with the amalgamation of the Ministry of Social Policy and the Department of Work and Income.

1 July 2006 - Child, Youth and Family becomes a service line of the Ministry of Social Development.

1 March 2010 - Senior Services established within the Ministry of Social Development.

1 February 2011 - Office of the Community and Voluntary Sector relocated to the Department of Internal Affairs.

1 July 2011 - Responsibility for the Retirement Commission transferred to the Minister of Commerce.

20 August 2012 - Youth Service established.

14 April 2014 - Social housing assessment and administration of the Income-related Rent Subsidy transferred to the Ministry of Social Development.

1 October 2014 - Ministry of Social Development: Community Investment established.

1 April 2017 - A new government department is established called: Oranga Tamariki - Ministry for Vulnerable Children and replaces Child, Youth and Family. The Ministry of Social Development becomes separate from Oranga Tamariki as an agency.

31 October 2017 - Oranga Tamariki - Ministry for Vulnerable Children is renamed Oranga Tamariki - Ministry for Children.

Functions

Services 

The Ministry of Social Development provides:
 employment, income support and superannuation services
 funding to community-service providers
 policy and advice to government
 student allowances and loans
 housing

Heartland Services
Heartland Services, a government-funded interagency initiative, provides people in provincial and rural New Zealand with access to Government services. Some Service Centres are based in existing government premises while others operate in stand-alone Heartland Service Centres.

Work and Income
Work and Income provides financial assistance and employment services throughout New Zealand. They offer a single point-of-contact for New Zealanders needing job-search support, financial assistance and in-work support.

On 1 September 2014 a beneficiary, Russell John Tully, shot two people dead in a Work and Income office in Ashburton. In 2016 it was reported that there had been a 12-fold increase in call-outs to the police at the Ministry's sites in the previous five years and that MSD had spent $20 million on extra security measures.

StudyLink
StudyLink administers Student Allowances, Student Loans and Jobseeker Support Student Hardship for people undertaking study.

Youth Service
Youth Service aims to get young people into education, training or work-based learning.

Senior Services
Senior Services:
 provides services to older people, including: New Zealand Superannuation, Veteran's Pension, Community Services Card, Residential Care Subsidy and Residential Support Subsidy
 administers the SuperGold Card.

Integrity Services
Integrity Services is a unit tasked to reduce fraud and abuse, to maximise debt collection, to strengthen integrity and to minimise risk across MSD.

Social services policy
Social services policy provides social-sector policy-advice concerning young people, working-age people, and older people. (The Ministry of Youth Development also sits within Social Services.)

Administered agencies
A number of other agencies are administered the Ministry of Social Development. They are generally responsible to a separate Minister.

Ministry of Youth Development
The Ministry of Youth Development encourages and assists young people to be involved in the social, educational, economic and cultural development of New Zealand, both locally and nationally.

The Ministry has five key functions:
providing young people with a central point of contact within government so they can express their views and interests
providing government with advice on how to improve outcomes for young people
working with government agencies, local government and communities to deliver positive youth development opportunities
funding services for young people in local communities
building and sharing an evidence-base about youth development in New Zealand.

The Office for Disability Issues
The Office for Disability Issues promotes and monitors the New Zealand Disability Strategy; provides policy advice on issues affecting people with disabilities; and provides services to the Minister for Disability Issues.

The Office for Senior Citizens
The Office for Senior Citizens provides policy advice on issues affecting older people; promotes and monitors the Positive Ageing Strategy; and provides services to the Minister for Senior Citizens.

Ministers 
The Ministry serves five portfolios and seven ministers.

Controversies
In February 2021, the Auditor-General investigated a scheme by the Ministry of Social Development where private landlords were paid exorbitant rental rates for emergency housing; some of which was reportedly unfit for human habitation. In mid-December 2021, the Auditor-General released a report criticised the Ministry for paying more than NZ$37 million in inflated rents between November 2017 and June 2020 to private landlords and property manager to provide emergency housing for homeless people. The report found that the Ministry did not exercise control over rental prices which drove up rental rates. Social Development Minister Carmel Sepuloni expressed surprise that the Ministry had not consulted her while the National Party's housing spokesperson Nicola Willis called for Sepuloni to hold the Ministry to account.

See also
Social welfare in New Zealand

References

External links 

StudyLink
Work and Income
Heartland Services
SuperGold Card
Housing Assessment
Ministry of Youth Development website
SuperSeniors, Office for Seniors
Oranga Tamariki - Ministry for Children

New Zealand
Social security in New Zealand
New Zealand Public Service departments